The Rio das Furnas Private Natural Heritage Reserve is a private natural heritage reserve in the state of Santa Catarina, Brazil.

Location

The Rio das Furnas Private Natural Heritage Reserve is in the municipality of Alfredo Wagner, Santa Catarina.
The Furnas River (Rio das Furnas) runs through the reserve.
The reserve protects an area of moist forest nestled in a canyon.
The canyon is in the Itajaí River basin in the Serra da Boa Vista, between the Cubatão, Tubarão and Tijucas basins.
There are seven waterfalls, several natural pools and an archaeological site.
Vegetation is the transition between dense and mixed rainforest with araucaria and altitude fields.
More than 170 species of birds have been identified.

Threats include invasion of seedlings from the pine monocultures around the reserve, fires in the surrounding plateaus, and capture of birds for captive breeding and sale.

History

The property was thought to cover .
A georeferenced topographic survey of the area in 2007 during preparation of the management plan determined that it was in fact .

Notes

Sources

Private natural heritage reserves of Brazil
Protected areas established in 2002
2002 establishments in Brazil
Protected areas of Santa Catarina (state)